Po-Chu Chui or Bo-Chu Chui (– 8 September 2019) was a Hong Kong film producer, known for collaborating with Stephen Chow and Jet Li.

Filmography
 And The Love Lingers, (executive, 1977)
 The Story of Woo Viet, (1981)
 Fong Sai-yuk II, (1993)
 Tai Chi Master, (1993)
 God.com, (1998)
 Crouching Tiger, Hidden Dragon, (associate, 2000)
 So Close, (2002)
 Kung Fu Hustle, (2004)
 Fearless, (2006)
 CJ7, (2008)
 Murderer, (executive, 2009)
 Jump, (2009)
 Confucius, (2010)
 The Sorcerer and the White Snake, (2011)
 Badges of Fury, (2013)
 Top Funny Comedian: The Movie, (2017)

References

Hong Kong film producers